Andre Agassi defeated Jason Stoltenberg in the final, 6–4, 6–4 to win the men's singles tennis title at the 1994 Canadian Open.

Mikael Pernfors was the reigning champion, but did not compete that year.

Seeds
A champion seed is indicated in bold text while text in italics indicates the round in which that seed was eliminated.

  Sergi Bruguera (quarterfinals)
  Todd Martin (second round)
  Michael Chang (third round)
  Jim Courier (semifinals)
  Petr Korda (second round)
  Wayne Ferreira (semifinals)
  Marc Rosset (third round)
  Andre Agassi (champion)
  Patrick Rafter (first round)
  Alexander Volkov (first round)
  Jaime Yzaga (third round)
  Ivan Lendl (third round)
  Aaron Krickstein (second round)
  MaliVai Washington (quarterfinals)
  Richey Reneberg (quarterfinals)
  Karsten Braasch (third round)

Draw

Finals

Top half

Section 1

Section 2

Bottom half

Section 3

Section 4

External links
 1994 Canadian Open draw

Men's Singles